Power to Win may refer to:

 Power to Win (song), the Port Adelaide Football Club song
 Power to Win (film), a 1942 short Australian documentary